Sébastien Charpentier (born 26 March 1973 in La Rochefoucauld, Charente) is a French motorcycle road racer.

He made his debut in 1996, when he won the France Honda CB500 Cup.  In 1997 he participated in the Supersport European Championship, and since 1998 he has participated in Supersport World Series (that became the Supersport World Championship in ) with Honda.  His 2006 title victory came after Yamaha Germany's Kevin Curtain crashed in the final round while looking set for the crown. He opened 2006 with a victory in Qatar and took three successive poles early in this season.

In 2000 he participated in the 24 Hours of Le Mans with William Costes and Sébastien Gimbert.

In the 2007 Supersport world championship, an injury-induced absence in some races reduced his final standing to 11th overall, in stark contrast to his double championships victories in the previous two years. He did not race full-time in 2008 or 2009, but did race the 2009 Le Mans motorcycle race, and mentored young Honda riders Gino Rea and Maxime Berger.

For 2010 he returned to World Supersport racing with Triumph, but quit the team after just one unsuccessful race. He then joined Daffix Racing BMW for the Endurance World Championship, swapping rides with countryman Matthieu Lagrive.

Career highlights
 1996 – France Honda CB500 Cup, Champion
 1997 – Supersport European Championship, Honda France, 1 place
 1998 – Supersport World Series, Honda Reflex Team, 13th, 27 pts (1 win)
  – Supersport World Championship, Team Elf Honda France, 19th, 20 pts
  – Supersport World Championship, Honda France Elf
 2001 – Supersport Spanish Championship
  – Supersport World Championship, Moto 1, 28th, 6 pts
  – Supersport World Championship, Moto 1, Team Klaffi Honda, 7th, 72 pts (1 podium)
  – Supersport World Championship, Team Klaffi Honda, 4th, 120 pts (5 podiums, 1 pole position, 1 fastest lap)
  – Supersport World Championship, Winston Ten Kate Honda, Champion, 210 pts (6 wins, 9 podiums, 10 pole positions, 8 fastest laps)
  – Supersport World Championship, Winston Ten Kate Honda, Champion, 194 pts (6 wins, 7 podiums, 8 pole positions, 4 fastest laps)
  – Supersport World Championship, Hannspree Ten Kate Honda, 11th, 51 pts (3 pole positions, 2 fastest laps)
  – Supersport World Championship, ParkinGO Triumph, 33rd, 3 pts

References

External links
 WorldSBK.com profile
 Castrol.com profile

1973 births
Living people
Sportspeople from Charente
French motorcycle racers
Supersport World Championship riders